Almost Killed Me is the debut studio album by Brooklyn-based rock band the Hold Steady, released on March 16, 2004 on Frenchkiss Records. It is considered by many to be a concept album, with several recurring themes such as near-death experiences, parties and the fictional character Charlemagne. Its concept album roots are further explored with the recurring characters in Separation Sunday, the Hold Steady's second album, which uses the same characters introduced in Almost Killed Me. Almost Killed Me was ranked number 99 on Rolling Stones 100 Best Albums of the Decade.

While not a full-time member of the band at this time, future keyboard player Franz Nicolay makes a guest appearance on the album alongside the World/Inferno Friendship Society bandmate Peter Hess.

Track listing
"Positive Jam" (Craig Finn) – 3:19
"The Swish" (Finn, Tad Kubler) – 4:11
"Barfruit Blues" (Finn, Kubler) – 3:31
"Most People Are DJs" (Finn, Kubler) – 5:50
"Certain Songs" (Finn) – 3:54
"Knuckles" (Finn) – 3:46
"Hostile, Mass." (Finn, Kubler) – 3:42
"Sketchy Metal" (Finn, Kubler) – 4:17
"Sweet Payne" (Finn, Kubler) – 4:33
"Killer Parties" (Finn, Kubler) – 5:48

Australian edition bonus tracks
"Milkcrate Mosh" – 5:56 
"Hot Fries" – 3:37 
"Curves and Nerves" – 2:40 
"Modesto Is Not That Sweet" – 3:12 
"You Gotta Dance" – 2:00

Note
The 2016 deluxe edition of Almost Killed Me contains the same bonus tracks as the Australian edition.

Personnel
Adapted from the album liner notes.

The Hold Steady
Craig Finn
Tad Kubler
Galen Polivka
Judd Counsell

Additional musicians
Franz Nicolay – piano
Peter Hess – saxophone

Technical
Dean Baltulonis – recording 
Matt Henderson – recording
Seth Jabour – layout, design 
Tad Kubler – photography, layout, design 
Tim Harrington – layout, design
Dave Gardner – mastering

References

2004 debut albums
The Hold Steady albums
Frenchkiss Records albums